Arthur "Butchy" Doe Jr. (April 26, 1959 - June 7, 2018) was an Irish-American mobster from Charlestown, Massachusetts. His father was Arthur Doe Sr., who was killed in the late 1960s in Boston.

External links
Arthur (Butchy) Doe Jr.
Arthur Doe Sr.
Career Thug's Back in Jail for Allegedly Bloodying His Wife by Laurel J. Sweet
[www.looksmartusa.com/p/articles/mi_qn4154/is_20050610/ai_n14661713 Boston Herald: Townie hood on payroll in alleged longshore scandal] by Casey Ross (cached on Google.com)
Boston Herald: Charlestown's Butchy Doe convicted in heroin rap by Joe Heaney (cached on Google.com)

1959 births
2018 deaths
American gangsters of Irish descent
American gangsters
Gangsters from Boston